Enemies or foes are a group that is seen as forcefully adverse or threatening.

Enemies may also refer to:

Literature
 Enemies (play), a 1906 play by Maxim Gorky
 Enemies, A Love Story, a 1966 novel by Isaac Bashevis Singer
 Enemies: How America's Foes Steal Our Vital Secrets – And How We Let It Happen, a 2006 non-fiction book by Bill Gertz

Film
 [[Enemies (1934 film)|Enemies (1934 film)]], a Mexican film
 Enemies (1940 film), a German film
 Enemies (1953 film), a Soviet drama film
 Enemies, a 1971 TV film directed by Fielder Cook
 Enemies, a Love Story (film), 1989 adaptation by Paul Mazursky, starring Anjelica Huston and Ron Silver
 Enemies (1974), a television-film adaptation directed by Kirk Browning and Ellis Rabb of the play of the same name by Maxim Gorky, starring Ellis Rabb

Music
 Enemies (band), a post-rock band from Ireland
 The Enemies EP (2004), a 2004 EP by the Headlights
 "Enemies" (Ryan Cabrera song)
 "Enemies" (Shinedown song)
 "Enemies", a song by In Case Of Fire from Align the Planets "Enemies", a song by M.I from The Chairman"Enemies" (Post Malone song)

Television
 "Enemies" (Buffy the Vampire Slayer), a 1999 episode of Buffy the Vampire Slayer "Enemies" (Stargate SG-1), a 2001 episode of Stargate SG-1 "Enemies" (The West Wing), a 1999 episode of The West Wing''

Other
 Enemies (champions), a 1981 role-playing game supplement